Communiqué was an indie rock band from the San Francisco Bay Area. The band originated as American Steel, but decided to record under the name Communiqué during the taping of A Crescent Honeymoon in 2002 because the synth-rock sound did not match the punk style of American Steel. In 2004, they released "Poison Arrows". In 2007, the "Communiqué" name was discontinued, with the members becoming American Steel again.

Band members
Rory Daniel Henderson - vocals/guitar
Ryan Massey - guitar/vocals
John Kincaid Peck - electric bass
Jamie Kissinger - drums
Steve Loewinsohn - keyboards
Cory Gowan - keyboards
Cary LaScala - touring drummer

Albums 
 A Crescent Honeymoon (2003)
 Poison Arrows (2004)
 Roses are Black (2005)
 Walk Into The Light (2006)

Other appearances 
 Lookout! Freakout Episode 3 (Cross Your Heart)
 Playing 4 Square 3 (Cross Your Heart)
 Second-Hand Suit Jacket Racket (Perfect Weapon)
 Take Action! Vol. 4 (Perfect Weapon)
 Sumosonic 30 (Perfect Weapon)
 Spin College Radio Fall 2004 - Volume 10 (Perfect Weapon)
 Protect: A Benefit For The National Association To Protect Children (Carrie Anne)
 This Is My Bag (Perfect Weapon, Cross Your Heart)
 Way To Walk (Way To Walk)
 Special Label Sampler (Cross Your Heart)
 The Cornerstone Player 048 (Cross Your Heart)
 The Cornerstone Player 041 (Cross Your Heart)
 The Cornerstone Player 051 (Perfect Weapon)
 Video Archive For The Ages, Volume 1 (Perfect Weapon)

External links
 Official Band homepage
Official American Steel Twitter
Official Communique Twitter
 Purevolume Communiqué page
 MySpace Communiqué page
 Lookout! Records Communiqué page
 MTV Communiqué page
 Sound Scene Revolution: Interview with Communiqué (Podcast)
 Discogs Page

Indie rock musical groups from California
Musical groups from San Francisco